The Bristol Mountains are found in the Mojave Desert of California, USA, just west of Mojave National Preserve. The range, which reaches an elevation of 3,874 feet (1,181 m), is located in San Bernardino County, and crosses Interstate 40 between Ludlow and the Granite Mountains. At the southern end of the range lies the town of Amboy, the Amboy Crater, and Bristol Dry Lake.

Bristol Mountains Wilderness Area
Most of the Bristol Mountains is in a Federally designated Wilderness and lies within either the Bristol Mountains Wilderness Area or the Kelso Dunes Wilderness Area.

The remainder of the range is designated for Wilderness status in the proposed California Desert Protection Act of 2010.

Project Carryall, proposed in 1963 by the Atomic Energy Commission, the California Division of Highways (now Caltrans), and the Santa Fe Railway, would have used 22 nuclear explosions to excavate a massive roadcut through the Bristol Mountains in the Mojave Desert, to accommodate construction of Interstate 40 and a new rail line.  This project would have been part of Operation Plowshare if not for public opposition.

See also 
 Cady Mountains
 Category: Mountain ranges of the Mojave Desert
 Category: Protected areas of the Mojave Desert

References 
 Official Bristol Mountains Wilderness Area website
 Official Kelso Dunes Wilderness Area website
 BLM Bristol Mountains Wilderness Area Map
 Bristol Mountains Wilderness photographs
 BLM Kelso Dunes Wilderness Area Map
 Kelso Dunes Wilderness photographs

Notes

Protected areas of the Mojave Desert
Protected areas of San Bernardino County, California
Mountain ranges of Southern California
Mountain ranges of the Mojave Desert
Mountain ranges of San Bernardino County, California
Bureau of Land Management areas in California